Ignacio Alfredo Wilkes Javier (born February 4, 1954) is a former Major League Baseball outfielder.

Baseball career
Javier was signed as an undrafted free agent by the Houston Astros in 1971.

Sources

1954 births
Águilas Cibaeñas players
Cedar Rapids Astros players
Cocoa Astros players
Columbus Astros players
Covington Astros players
Dominican Republic expatriate baseball players in the United States
Houston Astros players
Iowa Oaks players

Living people
Major League Baseball outfielders
Major League Baseball players from the Dominican Republic
Memphis Blues players
Santo Domingo Azucareros players
Sumter Astros players
Wichita Aeros players